Pesikta de-Rab Kahana (Hebrew: פסיקתא דרב כהנא) is a collection of aggadic midrash which exists in two editions, those of Solomon Buber (Lyck, 1868) and Bernard Mandelbaum (1962). It is cited in the Arukh and by Rashi.

The name
The term "pesikta" is an Aramaic cognate of the Hebrew "pasuk" or "verse".  The appearance of the name of "Rav Kahana" in the title (in manuscripts as early as the 11th century) is possibly to be explained in two ways:
Zunz and S. Buber consider the title to be due to the phrase "Rav Abba bar Kahana patah..." which opens the longest section of the work, for the Shabbat preceding the 17th of Tammuz.
 B. Mandelbaum considers the appearance in two manuscripts of the name "Rav Kahana" at the beginning of the Rosh Hashana chapter—which may have originally been the first chapter—as the more likely explanation for the use of his name in the title of the work.  The position of the Rosh Hashana section as the first pesikta is also attested by the Arukh.

It is unclear, in any case, which "Rav Kahana" is referred to in the title and in the work, since the six known individuals bearing that name all lived in Babylonia, while the Pesikta de-Rav Kahana was probably composed in Palestine.

Organization

It consists of 33 (or 34) homilies on the lessons forming the Pesikta cycle: the Pentateuchal lessons for special Sabbaths (Nos. 1-6) and for the festivals (Nos. 7-12, 23, 27-32), the prophetic lessons for the Sabbaths of mourning and comforting (Nos. 13-22), and the penitential sections "Dirshu" and "Shuvah" (Nos. 24, 25; No. 26 is a homily entitled "Seliḥot").

According to the arrangement in this edition the homilies fall into three groups: Pentateuchal, Prophetic, and Tishri, "piskot" (discourses on the lessons). An unnumbered "other piskah" to Isaiah 61:10 (following two manuscripts) is printed after No. 22; similarly No. 29 (following a manuscript) is designated with No. 28 as "another piskah" for Sukkot, and the pisḳah on pp. 194b et seq. (recognizable as spurious by the halakhic exordium, and also printed following a manuscript) is designated with No. 30 as another version of the piskah for Shemini. Piskot Nos. 12 and 32 each consist really of two homilies. But the second homily in No. 27 (pp. 174b et seq.) does not belong to the Pesikta.

The various manuscripts differ not only in regard to the above-mentioned second piskot and to other and longer passages, but also in regard to the arrangement of the entire collection, which began, in a manuscript which is defective at the beginning, with the homilies to prophetical lessons Nos. 13-22 and 24–25. These twelve homilies are designated by an old abbreviation as דש"ח נו"ע אר"ק שד"ש. Another manuscript, entitled "Haftarah Midrash," contains only these homilies, with the exception of next to the last one. Entire homilies of the Pesikta have been taken over, or sometimes worked over, into the Pesikta Rabbati; there are also a number of Pesikta homilies in the Tanhuma Midrashim.

Leviticus Rabbah also contains some of the homilies found in Pesikta. The parashiyyot 20, 27–30 in Leviticus Rabbah are, with the exception of a few differences, the same as piskot Nos. 27, 9, 8, 23, 28 of the Pesikta. Zunz takes the Pesikta to be dependent on Leviticus Rabbah, assigning this midrash to the middle of the 7th century, but the Pesikta to the year 700. Weiss, while emphasizing still more strongly the dependence of Pesikta on Leviticus Rabbah, takes it to be nearly as old as Genesis Rabbah; he thinks that the Pesikta took for its sources Genesis Rabbah, Leviticus Rabbah, Lamentations Rabbah, and Song of Songs Rabbah. But other authorities regard the Pesikta as the earliest midrash collection.

Dating
Undoubtedly the core of the Pesikta is very old, and must be classed together with Genesis Rabbah and Lamentations Rabbah. But the proems in the Pesikta, developed from short introductions to the exposition of the Scripture text into more independent homiletic structures, as well as the mastery of form apparent in the final formulas of the proems, indicate that the Pesikta belongs to a higher stage of midrashic development. The text of the current Pesikta was probably not finally fixed until its first printing, presumably in S. Buber's edition. Zunz gives a date of composition of 700 CE, but other factors argue for a date of composition in 5th or early 6th century.

The nature of certain Pentateuch lessons, intended apparently for the second feast-days (not celebrated in the Land of Israel), still calls for investigation, as well as the question as to the time at which the cycle of the twelve prophetic lessons designated by דש"ח, etc., came into use; this cycle is not mentioned in Talmudic times, but is subsequently stated to have been ordained or prescribed in the Pesikta.

References

.
 Braude, W G, Pesikta Derab Kahana,Jewish Publication Society of America; 2 edition (2002), . English translation.

External links
Pesikta de-Rav Kahana, Solomon Buber edition, scanned, PDF, at the daat.ac.il web site
Pesikta de-Rav Kahana, Mandelbaum edition, scanned, PDF

Aggadic Midrashim
Oral Torah